Dawkinsia tambraparniei is a species of cyprinid fish found in the Tambraparni River basin in the Western Ghats, Tamil Nadu, India.  This species can reach a length of  SL. Dawkinsia tambraparniei specie was originally described as Puntius arulius tambraparniei  from Tamiraparani River by Silas (1953) (Kannan, K, Johnson. A.J, Malleshappa. H., 2013). This species has been categorized under the new genus Dawkinisia (Pethyagoda. R, Meegaskumbura. M, Maduwage. k, 2012). This specie population has significantly decrease in recent years due to human activities like sand mining (Kannan, K, Johnson. A.J, Malleshappa. H., 2013)

References 

Dawkinsia
Freshwater fish of India
Endemic fauna of the Western Ghats
Fauna of Tamil Nadu
Taxa named by Eric Godwin Silas
Fish described in 1954